The Denmark women's national under-20 volleyball team represents Denmark in international women's volleyball competitions and friendly matches under the age 20 and it is ruled by the Danish Volleyball Federation That is an affiliate of Federation of International Volleyball FIVB and also a part of European Volleyball Confederation CEV.

Results

FIVB U20 World Championship
 Champions   Runners up   Third place   Fourth place

Europe U19 Championship
 Champions   Runners up   Third place   Fourth place

Team

Previous squad

References

External links
Official website
FIVB profile

V
National women's under-20 volleyball teams
Volleyball in Denmark